José Enrique Gutiérrez Cataluña (born 18 June 1974) is a Spanish former professional road racing cyclist. His career highlights include second place overall at the 2006 Giro d'Italia, winning a stage of the Vuelta a España and two stages at the Dauphiné Libéré.

Gutiérrez's name was brought up in the 2006 Operación Puerto doping case, and he was immediately made "non-active" (although not, according to team manager John Lelangue, suspended or fired) and so did not compete in any further events in 2006. Due to the Floyd Landis doping case of the 2006 Tour de France, Phonak withdrew their sponsorship of the team and it hence folded.

Major results

1997
 1st  Time trial, National Road Championships
2000
 Giro d'Italia
Held  after Stage 8
2001
 5th Gran Premio de Llodio
2002
 1st Stage 7 Critérium du Dauphiné Libéré
 4th Classique des Alpes
 6th Paris–Tours
2003
 3rd Overall Giro della Provincia di Lucca
2004
 1st Stage 20 Vuelta a Espana
 3rd Classique des Alpes
 6th Overall Critérium du Dauphiné Libéré
1st  Combination classification
1st Stage 2
 6th Overall Clásica Internacional de Alcobendas
2005
 5th Overall Escalada a Montjuïc
2006
 2nd Overall Giro d'Italia
 4th Overall Tour de Georgia
2007
 5th Monte Paschi Eroica
 5th Grand Prix de Wallonie
 6th Grand Prix de Fourmies
2009
 7th Overall Vuelta a la Comunidad de Madrid
 10th Overall Vuelta Mexico Telmex
2011
 1st Stage 3 (TTT) Vuelta a Colombia

Grand Tour general classification results timeline

References

External links

Spanish male cyclists
1974 births
Living people
Spanish Vuelta a España stage winners
Sportspeople from Valencia
Cyclists from the Valencian Community